Ceferino Montano Garcia (August 26, 1906 – January 1, 1981) was a champion boxer born in Naval, Biliran, Philippines. He holds the most victories ever achieved by a Filipino boxer and is also the only boxer from the Philippines to become world champion in the middleweight division. Garcia is commonly credited to as the first well known user of the bolo punch, which was later popularized by Cuban fighter Kid Gavilán. He was inducted into the Ring Magazine Hall of Fame in 1977 and the World Boxing Hall of Fame in 1989.

Early life
Ceferino Garcia was the son of Fortunato Garcia and Pascuala Montano and was the oldest of six children. He never completed first grade and indulged rather frequently in gambling. At 17, he was feared by so many that nobody would take him in a street fight. He was also a skilled blacksmith.

Boxing success
While working at a bakery in Cebu City, Garcia met a boxing promoter. This was where his career as boxer started.

On September 23, 1937, Garcia first had a shot for a world title in the welterweight division. However, Barney Ross bested him by unanimous decision.

On October 2, 1939, Garcia fought Fred Apostoli for the world Middleweight title in the United States and won it by TKO in the 7th round. He defended that title three times until he lost to Ken Overlin on points. He was managed, during the final years of his career by George Parnassus.

Life after boxing
After retiring from the ring he made a few uncredited appearances in Hollywood films with the exception of "Joe Palooka, Champ" in which he plays himself. He was also employed for a time by actress Mae West as her chauffeur and bodyguard.

During the 1930s and 1940s, Garcia lived on 1042 S. Rowan St., in the Boyle Heights neighborhood of Los Angeles.

Garcia died on January 1, 1981, while in San Diego, California. His grave is located at Valhalla Memorial Park Cemetery in North Hollywood, California.

Professional boxing record

Boxing Hall of Fame

Filipino Hall of Fame Boxers

References

External links
 

People from Biliran
People from Tondo, Manila
1906 births
1981 deaths
Middleweight boxers
Sportspeople from Manila
Boxers from Metro Manila
Burials at Valhalla Memorial Park Cemetery
Filipino male boxers
Philippine Sports Hall of Fame inductees